Hannahs Mill is a census-designated place (CDP) in Upson County, Georgia, United States. The population was 3,267 at the 2000 census.

Geography

Demographics

As of the census of 2000, there were 3,267 people, 1,278 households, and 972 families residing in the CDP. The racial makeup of the CDP was 91.67% White, 6.40% African American, 0.49% Native American, 0.80% Asian, and 0.64% from two or more races. Hispanic or Latino of any race were 1.44% of the population.

There were 1,278 households, out of which 33.1% had children under the age of 18 living with them, 58.9% were married couples living together, 13.5% had a female householder with no husband present, and 23.9% were non-families. 20.7% of all households were made up of individuals, and 9.2% had someone living alone who was 65 years of age or older.  The average household size was 2.56 and the average family size was 2.92.

In the CDP, the population was spread out, with 24.7% under the age of 18, 8.1% from 18 to 24, 27.5% from 25 to 44, 24.6% from 45 to 64, and 15.0% who were 65 years of age or older.  The median age was 38 years. For every 100 females, there were 95.4 males.  For every 100 females age 18 and over, there were 89.3 males.

The median income for a household in the CDP was $33,714, and the median income for a family was $39,398. Males had a median income of $30,391 versus $19,833 for females. The per capita income for the CDP was $15,746.  About 6.4% of families and 11.1% of the population were below the poverty line, including 15.2% of those under age 18 and 10.6% of those age 65 or over.

References

Census-designated places in Georgia (U.S. state)
Census-designated places in Upson County, Georgia